Pectoralis minor muscle is a thin, triangular muscle, situated at the upper part of the chest, beneath the pectoralis major in the human body. It arises from ribs III-V; it inserts onto the coracoid process of the scapula. It is innervated by the medial pectoral nerve. Its function is to stabilise the scapula by holding it fast in position against the chest wall.

Structure

Attachments 
From the muscle's origin, the muscle's fibers pass superiorly and laterally, converging to form a flat tendon.

Origin 
Pectoralis minor muscle arises from the upper margins and outer surfaces of the 3rd, 4th, and 5th ribs near their costal cartilages, and from the aponeuroses covering the intercostalis.

Insertion 
Its tendon inserts onto the medial border and upper surface of the coracoid process of the scapula.

Innervation 
The muscle receives motor innervation from the medial pectoral nerve.

Relations 

Pectoralis minor muscle forms part of the anterior wall of the axilla. It is covered anteriorly (superficially) by the clavipectoral fascia. The medial pectoral nerve pierces the pectoralis minor and the clavipectoral fascia. In attaching to the coracoid process, the pectoralis minor forms a 'bridge' - structures passing into the upper limb from the thorax will pass directly underneath.

Axillary nodes are classified according to their positions relative to the pectoralis minor muscle. Level 1 are lateral, Level 2 are deep, Level 3 are medial. The pectoralis minor divides the axillary artery into three parts (in contrary sequence compared to the nodes) - first part medial, second part deep/posterior, third part lateral in relation to the pectoralis minor.

Variations 

The origin is from the second, third and fourth or fifth ribs. The tendon of insertion may extend over the coracoid process to the greater tubercle. It may be split into several parts. Absence of this muscle is rare but happens with certain uncommon diseases, such as the Poland syndrome.

Function 
Pectoralis minor muscle depresses the point of the shoulder, drawing the scapula superior, towards the thorax, and throwing its inferior angle posteriorly.

See also
Pectoralis minor syndrome

References

External links 

 
 
 
 
 
 Slide

Muscles of the upper limb

cs:Prsní svaly